The 1997 Superbike World Championship was the tenth FIM Superbike World Championship season. The season started on 23 March at Phillip Island and finished on 12 October at Sentul after 12 rounds.

John Kocinski won the riders' championship with 9 victories and Honda won the manufacturers' championship.

Race calendar and results

Championship standings

Riders' standings
Riders entered into the European Superbike Championship—who scored points towards a separate championship— were not eligible to score World Championship points.

Manufacturers' standings

References 

Superbike racing
Superbike World Championship seasons